Jim Donovan (born March 10, 1968) is a professional drummer and percussionist, a recording artist, writer, teacher and lecturer. He is best known as the former drummer and one of the founding members of the band Rusted Root. He is also the author of the book Drum Circle Leadership: Learn to Create and Lead Your Own Transformational Drum Circles.

Education
Donovan studied and played African rhythms with various master drummers such as Congolese master drummer Elie Kihonia, Mamady Keita and Mbemba Bangoura. He also studied African music with noted scholar Kwabena Nketia from Ghana.  He holds a B.A. in Music Performance from the University of Pittsburgh and a Masters of Educational Leadership from Saint Francis University where he is an instructor in the university's Fine Arts Program and the director of both the university's World Drumming Ensemble and Arts in the Mountains Festival.

Donovan's CD Revelation #9 was nominated for 2004 Electronica Album of the Year by Just Plain Folks Songwriters organization. He was named winner of the 2008 Best Drum Circle Facilitator award, and was a nominee for 2008 Best Percussion Performance in Drum! Magazine.

Discography
1998 – Indigo: Music for Exploration Volume 1 (Triloka)
2000 – Pulse: Music for Exploration Volume 2
2000 – Rhythm and Drumming Vol.1 (Play along CD)
2001 – Rhythm & Drumming Vol. 2 (Play-along CD)
2004 – Revelation #9
2005 – Live on Earth (For A Limited Time Only) – Krishna Das (Triloka)
2006 – Drum the Ecstatic International Live
2006 – The Yoga of Drum and Chant
2006 – Rhythmic Foundation Volume 1 Instructional audio CD
2006 – Rhythmic Foundation Volume 2 Instructional audio CD

Instructional DVD
2007 – Jim Donovan's Rhythmic Foundation: Interactive African Drumming for Everyone Volume 1 DVD

With Rusted Root

1994 – When I Woke (Mercury/Universal)
1996 – Remember (Mercury/Universal)
1996 – Evil Ways (Mercury/Universal)
1998 – Rusted Root (Mercury/Universal)
2002 – Welcome to My Party (Island)
2003 – Cruel Sun (Touchy Pegg)
2004 – Rusted Root Live (Touchy Pegg)
2005 – 20th Century Masters – The Millennium Collection: The Best of Rusted Root (Mercury/Universal)

See also
Sun King Warriors

References

External links
 JimDonovanMusic.com
 JimDonovanDrums.com
 Jim Donovan Blog

1968 births
Living people
University of Pittsburgh alumni
American percussionists
20th-century American drummers
American male drummers
20th-century American male musicians
American music educators